Archibald John Shields  (28 May 1914 – 25 August 1995) was an Australian rules footballer who played for the Carlton Football Club in the Victorian Football League (VFL).

Notes

External links 

Arch Shields's profile at Blueseum

1914 births
1995 deaths
Carlton Football Club players
Australian rules footballers from Victoria (Australia)
Tongala Football Club players